Jon Harley (born 26 September 1979) is an English former professional footballer.

A left-back, he played for Chelsea and Fulham in the Premier League, Wimbledon, Sheffield United, West Ham United, Burnley, Watford, Notts County Rotherham United and Portsmouth in the Football League, and in the Isthmian League for Maidstone United.

Early life
Born in Maidstone, Kent, Harley grew up in the Maidstone suburb of Allington, attending Oakwood Park Grammar School and playing for the local junior team Castle Colts.

Career

Chelsea
Harley started his career with Chelsea, making his debut against Derby County in April 1998. Despite some impressive performances, especially in the 1999–2000 season, during which he was a member of Chelsea's FA Cup winning squad, albeit as an unused substitute in the final, he was unable to establish himself in the London side. He ultimately made 42 appearances for Chelsea and scored two goals, both of which were winners in the 1999–2000 FA Premier League against future club Watford and Leeds United. He also had a loan spell with Wimbledon, where he scored twice, both goals coming in a 4–0 win over Crewe Alexandra on his debut. In his final season at Chelsea, Harley was third choice behind Celestine Babayaro and Graeme Le Saux.

Fulham
He signed for newly promoted Fulham in August 2001 for £3.5million. Harley was equally unable to establish himself in the Fulham side, despite a somewhat outstanding goal against Aston Villa, in which he beat Peter Enckelman with a 40-yard strike. This was the only goal he achieved in 19 league starts over three seasons. He joined Sheffield United and later West Ham United on loan where he scored once, in a 3–3 draw against Sheffield United on his debut.

Sheffield United
He joined Sheffield United permanently in June 2004 on a free transfer, playing regularly and scoring two goals.

Burnley
A year later he moved to Burnley in a deal for just £75,000 initially, with further payments linked to first-team appearances.

Harley managed to establish himself as the club's first choice left-back, starting with a series of impressive performances. He is known for his attacking intent and often gets forward to offer support down the left-wing. Harley is also an excellent set-piece taker and was vital to many of Burnley's free-kick 'routines'. Despite his ability his form dipped mid-season, but later recovered to end the campaign with a number of solid performances, culminating in his winning the "Player of the Season" award. He remained almost ever-present during his second season with Burnley.

At the start of the 2007–08 season, Harley found himself playing in the unaccustomed position of left-sided midfielder or on the bench, replaced by new signing Stephen Jordan. An injury to Jordan allowed him to regain his place and this coincided with a run of much-improved results for Burnley. On 9 March 2008, however, Harley failed to agree a new deal with Burnley, signalling his intent to leave the club during the following summer.

Watford
On 17 July 2008 Harley signed a two-year-deal with Watford. On 4 October 2008 he scored his first Watford league goal, scoring in the 12th minute in a home game against Preston North End. Watford went on to win the game 2–1.

Notts County
On 14 July 2010, Harley signed for the Football League Two Champions Notts County on a two-year deal and established himself as a regular member of the team in the 2010–11 season. In September 2011 he turned out for Australian A-League side Melbourne Victory in a bid to win a full-time contract, the move, however, fell through. In October 2011, he joined League Two side Rotherham United on a one-month emergency loan, which was then extended in November to last until January 2012.

In May 2012 he was released by the club, along with 12 other players.

Portsmouth
On 16 August 2012, Harley signed for League One club Portsmouth on a short-term contract. Harley made his debut in a League One match against AFC Bournemouth, the match ended 1–1. He scored his only goal for Portsmouth in a 2–1 defeat away to Stevenage on 24 October 2012. He was released alongside five other players on 15 January 2013.

Maidstone United
On 13 March 2013, Harley signed for his hometown club Maidstone United on a non-contract basis, combining his time with the semi-professional club with working as a youth coach for the Chelsea Academy.

Portsmouth
Jon Harley was appointed as assistant head coach to John Mousinho on 16 February 2023.

Career statistics

Honours
Chelsea
FA Cup: 2000

References

External links

'Harley Exits Clarets' Sky Sports.com, 10/05/08

1979 births
Living people
English footballers
Premier League players
Chelsea F.C. players
Wimbledon F.C. players
Fulham F.C. players
West Ham United F.C. players
Sheffield United F.C. players
Burnley F.C. players
Watford F.C. players
Notts County F.C. players
Rotherham United F.C. players
Portsmouth F.C. players
Maidstone United F.C. players
English Football League players
Sportspeople from Maidstone
Association football defenders
Association football midfielders
England youth international footballers
England under-21 international footballers
People from Allington, Kent
Portsmouth F.C. non-playing staff
Association football coaches